John Lee (active 1850–1870) was a Pre-Raphaelite British painter; part of a group of Merseyside artists from the period which also included William Lindsay Windus and William Davis. The son of Liverpool merchants, he lived in Rock Ferry before moving to London in 1866. His works were shown at the Liverpool Academy from 1859 to 1867 and at the Royal Academy from 1863 to 1867. However, little else is known of his life, and only four paintings have been attributed to him with any certainty.

Sweethearts and Wives, 1860, is considered Lee's masterpiece. It has been suggested that the rightmost sailor is a self-portrait of John Lee.

See also
 List of Pre-Raphaelite paintings – including the work of John Lee.
 Daniel Alexander Williamson
 James Campbell
 British Marine Art (Romantic Era)

References

English romantic painters
Pre-Raphaelite painters
19th-century English painters
English male painters
Year of birth unknown
Year of death unknown
Artists from Liverpool
19th-century English male artists